Cell: The Web Series is an Austin, Texas-based science fiction/drama web series which debuted Feb 03, 2010 on Koldcast.tv.  Cell: The Web Series is about a man wakes up in a cell after a night on the town. When he realizes he’s not in jail and he’s not alone, he fights to stay who he is while helping someone else remember who they were.

After streaming exclusively on Koldcast.tv for over a year, CELL recently expanded its streaming hosts to include Blip.TV as well as YouTube. Because of earlier restrictions placed on the length of content on YouTube, not all episodes could be streamed through the service. After YouTube expanded the time allowed for episodes, the entire first season was placed on YouTube.

Reception

Critical Reception
CELL: The Web Series has been accepted into four international festivals.
 2010 Independent Television Festival - Los Angeles
 2010 Cinema Tous Ecrans - Geneva, Switzerland
 2010 Beverly Hills Film, Television, and New Media Festival - Beverly Hills
 2011 LA Web Fest - Los Angeles

Awards
Season 1 of CELL: The Web Series received nominations and won several awards since its release.

Characters
Brian - Played by Danny Cameron.
The Man - Played by Kevin McCarthy.
Woman - Played by Jourdan Gibson.
Brenda - Played by Beth Chamberlin.

Future
Season 2 is under development and awaiting funding.

References

External links
 Official website of Cell: The Web Series
 Official Network of Cell: The Web Series
 Cell: The Web Series on Facebook
 Cell: The Web Series on Twitter

2010 web series debuts
American science fiction web series
2010s YouTube series